The Fort Marcy Stakes is a Grade II American Thoroughbred horse race for three-years-old and older run over a distance of  miles on the turf annually in early May at Belmont Park, in Elmont, New York. The event currently offers a purse of $150,000 added.

History

It was initially known as the Fort Marcy Handicap but was renamed to the Fort Marcy Stakes beginning with its 2009 running.

The race is named for the U.S. Racing Hall of Fame horse, Fort Marcy.

Inaugurated on 31 August 1975, the event was run at Belmont Park a distance of seven furlongs. It was run in two divisions that year as well as in 1978, 1981, and 1987. The event was not held in 1976 and 1977.

In 1980, the Fort Marcy Handicap was restricted to horses, age four and older. The event was hosted by Belmont Park in 1981, 1987, 1988 and since 2009. In 1998 and 2003, bad weather resulted in the race being contested on the dirt track at a distance of one mile (8 furlongs).

From 2014 the race has been run at  miles on the Inner Turf track.

In 2020 the event was upgraded to Grade II.

Records
Speed  record: 
  miles – 1:46.11  Tribhuvan   (2021)
  miles – 1:40.88 Spindrift (2000)

Margins: 
 8 lengths – Subordination (1998)

Most wins:
 2 – Adam Smith (1993, 1994)

Most wins by an owner:
 3 – Hobeau Farm (1975, 1983, 2004)
 3 – Rokeby Stable (1981, 1984, 1987)
 3 – Madaket Stables, (2019, 2021, 2022)

Most wins by a jockey:
 3 – José A. Santos (1986, 1988, 1995)
 3 – Jean-Luc Samyn (1993, 1997, 2000)
 3 – Eric Cancel (2017, 2021, 2022)

Most wins by a trainer:
 6 – Chad C. Brown (2015, 2018, 2019, 2020, 2021, 2022)

Winners

Legend:

 
 

Notes:

† Ran as an entry

See also
List of American and Canadian Graded races

References

Graded stakes races in the United States
Grade 2 stakes races in the United States
Horse races in New York (state)
Turf races in the United States
Open mile category horse races
Belmont Park
Recurring sporting events established in 1975
1975 establishments in New York (state)